Various folk cultures and traditions assign symbolic meanings to plants. Although these are no longer commonly understood by populations that are increasingly divorced from their rural traditions, some meanings survive. In addition, these meanings are alluded to in older pictures, songs and writings. New symbols have also arisen: one of the most known in the United Kingdom is the red poppy as a symbol of remembrance of the fallen in war.

List

Plants

Flowers

See also

References

 Symbols Dictionary: Flowers and Plants
 Symbolism of Plants, Trees, and Herbs
 
 
 
 
 
 

Symbolism
Language of flowers
Plants in culture